Chestnut Hill Reservation is a public recreation area and historic preserve surrounding the Chestnut Hill Reservoir in the Chestnut Hill and Brighton neighborhoods of Boston, Massachusetts. The reserve is part of the Chestnut Hill Reservoir Historic District, is listed on the National Register of Historic Places, and is a City of Boston Landmark. It is managed by the Department of Conservation and Recreation.

Activities and amenities
A one-mile walking path encircles the reservoir. Shoreline fishing is offered. The reservoir is a popular birding location, where at least 195 species have been observed. The Reilly Memorial Recreation Center beside the reservoir has a swimming pool and skating rink. A building across the street from the reservoir, which housed pumping equipment for the water system, has been converted into the Metropolitan Waterworks Museum.

Image gallery

See also

 National Register of Historic Places listings in Boston, Massachusetts
 National Register of Historic Places listings in Massachusetts

References

External links
Chestnut Hill Reservation Department of Conservation and Recreation
Newton Conservators

Chestnut Hill, Massachusetts
State parks of Massachusetts
Massachusetts natural resources
Parks in Boston